Royal Johan Kxao ǀUiǀoǀoo (born 30 September 1966) is a Namibian politician who is serving in the cabinet of Namibia as deputy Minister of Marginalised People since March 2015. He was a member of Parliament as a SWAPO backbencher between 2000 and 2010, and after that a special advisor in the Office of the Deputy Prime Minister.

Early life and education
ǀUiǀoǀoo was born on 30 September 1966 in Tsumkwe in the Otjozondjupa Region. He grew up in Botswana. Between 1991 and 1997 he worked as a teacher at different schools. In 2000 he finished his matric at NamCOL and holds a certificate in Linguistic Studies in African Languages.  he is enrolled at Unisa for a law degree.

ǀUiǀoǀoo is an ethnic ǃKung from Tsumkwe Juǀʼhoan-speaking community, for which he is also a senior traditional officer. At the time he became a parliamentarian in 2000, he was the youngest ever SWAPO MP. He also was the first and only San to serve in Parliament.

Notes

References

1966 births
Living people
People from Otjozondjupa Region
Members of the National Assembly (Namibia)
San people
SWAPO politicians